Tamar-kali (born Tamara Colletta Brown) is an American rock singer-songwriter and composer based in Brooklyn, New York.

Early life
Tamar-kali was born and raised in Brooklyn a 2nd generation musician through her father, who was a band leader and played bass in local funk and soul bands. Her father even had her perform with the band as she was exposed to singing along with live instrumentation as a child. She grew up with an eclectic appreciation for music with influences from home and choral classical training at school. She spent the summers of her childhood with her mother's family on St. Helena Island, South Carolina where she developed a deep appreciation for her Gullah roots, a mixture of Indigenous Southern U.S. and West African customs and languages. She attended Catholic School for 13 years, which she credits for her rebellious nature and sound. Her musical inspirations include PJ Harvey, Grace Jones, The Mars Volta, Deftones, Betty Davis, Patti Smith, Archie Bell and the Drells, Ray, Goodman and Brown, Crown Heights Affair and Quicksand.

She attended Adelphi University where she studied English Education. She teaches and has become very involved in the North African dance art form Raqs Sharqi as well as Middle Eastern Belly Dance.

The "kali" in her performing name is inspired by the Hindu goddess Kali.

Career

Recordings
After tenures as a member of Funkface and Song of Seven, Tamar-kali became a solo writer, musician and composer in 1997. She rose to prominence starring in James Spooner's award-winning documentary Afro-Punk. The indie film spotlighted her performances and made her the official face for the DVD cover artwork.

As a vocalist she has supported artists like Fishbone on tour and OutKast on the group's second album, ATLiens.

She has performed in such venues as Brooklyn Academy of Music and Lincoln Center, sometimes paying tribute to Nina Simone, Betty Davis and Odetta. In August 2009 she performed at the BRC Orchestra's "Four Women: A Salute to Miriam Makeba, Eartha Kitt, Abbey Lincoln and Odetta" at Damrosch Park in Lincoln Center.
She was the Musical Director for the Black Rock Coalition's Tribute to Nina Simone which held concerts in NYC (2003, 2009 and 2010) as well as Paris and the South of France (2009). She has shared the stage with Paramore, Fishbone, Dubwar, Joi, Carl Hancock Rux, Cassandra Wilson, Saul Williams, The Dirtbombs, Jean Grae and Earl Greyhound.

According to MTV.com she is well known and considered a "favorite" on the NYC underground punk rock music scene. She often performs with her Psychochamber Ensemble of Strings and has been featured in VIBE, Village Voice, Trace, The Fader and Arise Magazine.

In 2006 she released her first music video for the single "Boot" off her debut EP Geechee Goddess Hardcore Warrior Soul. The theme dealt with a young black girl lacking awareness of her own beauty, being left vulnerable to sexual exploitation.

Her debut studio album, Black Bottom, was released in Fall 2010 on the OyaWarrior label.

In March 2018, she created multi-disciplinary project named Demon Fruit Blues. This video premiered at Mabou Mines in New York City. It is about the journey of misogyny spanning from the Garden of Eden to the present while also including biblical elements as well as female African deities and feminist theory. This project was entirely composed by Tamar-Kali with instrumentation include acoustic guitar, harp, violin, viola, cello, and bass. The composition was informed and motivated by her own life as a black woman and artist.

Composing
Tamar-kali is a frequent collaborator with director Dee Rees. She scored her first feature film Mudbound, for which she won the World Soundtrack Award in the Discovery of the Year category The film marks her third collaboration with the director after appearing in Pariah, which was Rees' first feature film, and writing a song for Bessie on HBO. For Bessie, she provided a few songs on the soundtrack including her own vocals as well as performing with her band in one of the scenes. Tamar-Kali and Rees have cultivated a relationship given the fact that they are both two black women in a male dominated field; Tamar-kali even attributes her film scoring career to Rees. In 2020 she composed the score to Rees’ adaptation of Joan Didion’s The Last Thing He Wanted.

She has since scored other feature films including Come Sunday, The Lie, Shirley, and The Assistant. During an interview, Tamar-kali discusses how her career as an independent artist has contributed to her career in film scoring while also learning about technology to a greater extent in addition to working with a director.

Discography

Albums
 Geechee Goddess Hardcore Warrior Soul EP, (OyaWarrior Records, 2005)
 Black Bottom LP, (OyaWarrior Records, 2010)

Singles
 "Boot" (2006)
https://www.youtube.com/watch?v=-6-WQTjiIyU
 "Pearl" remix f/ Jean Grae (2010)
https://www.youtube.com/watch?v=2Daxf8GDa5c

References

External links
Official site
 
Mabou Mines
NPR
Focus Features
Billboard

Living people
21st-century African-American women singers
21st-century American composers
21st-century American women guitarists
21st-century American women singers
21st-century American singers
Adelphi University alumni
African-American women singer-songwriters
African-American film score composers
African-American guitarists
American film score composers
American women film score composers
American women guitarists
Composers from New York City
Guitarists from New York City
Musicians from Brooklyn
Singer-songwriters from New York (state)
Year of birth missing (living people)